Ave Pildas (born September 16, 1939) is an American photographer and designer. His early photographs of jazz musicians, including Nina Simone, Dizzy Gillespie, John Coltrane and Dave Brubeck were first published in DownBeat magazine in the 1960s. In 1971, Pildas began working at Capitol Records in Hollywood as an art director and designed and photographed album covers for Capitol's recording artists, including The Road Is No Place for a Lady by Cass Elliot and the MGM Records Archetypes Series, featuring The Velvet Underground, Billie Holiday, Charlie Parker, and Joy to the World by Hoyt Axton. Two books of his photographs have been published: Art Deco Los Angeles, published by Harper & Row in 1977, and Movie Palaces, Originally, published by Clarkson N. Potter, Inc. in 1980, second printing by Hennessey & Ingalls in 2000. His photos are included in the collections of LACMA (Los Angeles County Museum of Art), MoMA (Museum of Modern Art), New York Public Library, and Bibliotheca National, Paris. Ave Pildas is married to artist Phyllis Green.

Early life and career 
Ave Pildas was born in Cincinnati, Ohio, where he attended high school and college. He studied architecture at the University of Cincinnati, and Graphic Design at the Cincinnati Art Academy.  While attending college, he worked as the Art Director for the Public Library System of Cincinnati. At the same time, Ave started his photography career, working for the jazz publication Downbeat Magazine, where he photographed celebrated musicians such as Paul Desmond, Roland Kirk, Gerry Mulligan, John Coltrane, and many others. Upon graduation, he worked in Pittsburgh, PA, designing collateral for major corporations like Westinghouse, US Steel, Alcoa Aluminum, and Koppers. In 1965, he resumed his studies in Switzerland at the Schule für Gestaltung Basel, where he received his graduate degree in Graphic Design and Typography in 1967. During breaks in schooling, he traveled extensively in Europe and parts of Africa. Ave returned to the United States to teach design at Layton School of Art in Milwaukee. In 1969, he moved to Philadelphia, Pennsylvania, to become assistant professor of design at the Philadelphia College of Art. In 1971, Pildas moved to Los Angeles to become an art director at Capitol Records. In 1972, he partnered with Miles Tilton to form "Plug In", a design studio  and produced work for many clients in the entertainment industry at the same time, his photography career flourished and by the late 70s his images were used by advertising agencies and popular magazines worldwide. In 1985 he became a professor at Otis College of Art & Design and subsequently a director of Otis Design Group. Otis Design Group was  a student design studio that designed real collateral for non-profit organizations, including the City of Los Angeles, Meals on Wheels, Spirit Awakening Foundation, and Hollywood Farmers Market.  In 2001 he was appointed chair of the Communication Arts Department at Otis College of Art & Design. In 2003–2004, he served as vice-president of education for the AIGA (American Institute of Graphic Arts), Los Angeles. In 2008, Pildas retired from teaching to devote himself to photography. In 2015, Ave Pildas created Small Photo Books, a publishing company featuring his photography.

Photography career

1960–1970 
As a young fan of jazz, Ave took his camera to nightclubs, after-hours spots and music festivals in Cincinnati and Pittsburgh. He shot hundreds of images that provide a window on the midwestern jazz circuit from that time.

1970–1980 
Ave photographed spontaneous moments on the "Walk of Fame". Many of those photos were published in ‘Zoom’, ‘Photo’, ‘Creative Camera’ and other magazines of the 1970s. They were also exhibited in both the United States and in Europe. During the same decade, he photographed box offices, which become a very famous collection.

Exhibitions and collections 
His photographs have been exhibited in one-person shows at the following: Contemporary Arts Center, Cincinnati, Photographers Gallery, London, Janus Gallery, Los Angeles, Gallerie Diaframma, Milan, Cannon Gallery, Amsterdam, Gallerie 38, Zurich, Joseph Bellows, Photo LA, The Loft, The Perfect Exposure Gallery, Tufenkian Fine Arts and in numerous group shows. They have been featured in: The New York Times Magazine, The Guardian, L’Oeil de la Photographie,  'ZOOM', 'PHOTO', 'CAMERA', 'photographic' and many other publications worldwide. Photographs by Ave Pildas are included in the collections of LACMA, the Bibliotheca National, Paris; the University of Arizona as well as numerous other public and private collections.

Published works 

 Pildas, Ave (1977). Art deco : Los Angeles : photographs (1st ed.). New York: Harper & Row. . OCLC 3670911
 Pildas, Ave (2000). Movie palaces. Smith, Lucinda. Santa Monica, CA: Hennessey + Ingalls. . OCLC 44267725
 Pildas, Ave (2015). Photomat / Photos. Los Angeles: Small Books. 
 Pildas, Ave (2015). Shadows / Silhouettes. Los Angeles: Small Books. 
 Pildas, Ave (2015). Street / People. Los Angeles: Small Books. 
 Pildas, Ave (2015). People on Stars. Los Angeles: Small Books. 
 Pildas, Ave (2015). Odd Shots. Los Angeles: Small Books. 
 Pildas, Ave (2015). Nudes. Los Angeles: Small Books. 
 Pildas, Ave (2016). Bijou. Paso Robles, CA: Nazraeli Press. . OCLC 960852357

Selected bibliography 

 Pildas, Ave (2015-08-05). "Where the streets are paved with stars: Hollywood Boulevard in the 70s – in pictures". The Guardian. . Retrieved 2020-10-15
 "Strippers, wedding trucks and dinosaurs: the brilliant 50-year photography career of Ave Pildas". www.itsnicethat.com. Retrieved 2020-10-15
 "Interview with Ave Pildas". Street Photography Magazine. 2014-05-21. Retrieved 2020-10-15
 "Ave Pildas". Discogs. Retrieved 2020-10-15

External links 

 Ave Pildas's Website
 Ave Pilda's Jazz Photography
 Small Photo Books

References 

Living people
1939 births
University of Cincinnati alumni
Jazz photographers
20th-century American photographers
21st-century American photographers